The general speed limits in Cyprus are as follows:

References

Cyprus
Roads in Cyprus